Catalogue 2005 is the sixth compilation album by Buck-Tick, released on December 7, 2005. It is an updated, expanded edition of Catalogue 1987–1995 that was released in 1995. However, it does not contain "M・A・D", "Die" or "Mienai Mono o Miyou to Suru Gokai Subete Gokai da". It reached number fourteen on the Oricon chart.

Track listing

Disc One 
 "Hurry Up Mode"
 "Sexual XXXXX!"
 "Physical Neurose"
 "Just One More Kiss"
 "Speed" (スピード)
 "Sakura" (さくら; Cherry Blossom)
 "Jupiter"
 "Angelic Conversation"
 "Iconoclasm"
 "Aku no Hana" (悪の華; Evil Flower)
 "Dress" (ドレス)
 "Kodou" (鼓動; Heartbeat)
 "Uta" (唄; Song)
 "Candy" (キャンディ)
 "Cosmos"
 "My Fuckin' Valentine"
 "Miu" (ミウ)

Disc Two 
 "Glamorous"
 "Baby, I Want You."
 "Rhapsody"
 "Flame"
 "Shippu no Blade Runner" (疾風のブレードランナー; Hurricane’s Blade Runner)
 "21st Cherry Boy"
 "Kyokuto Yori Ai wo Komete" (極東より愛を込めて; From the Far East with Love)
 "Long Distance Call"
 "Zangai" (残骸; Wreck)
 "Girl"
 "Mona Lisa"
 "Gensou no Hana" (幻想の花; Flowers of Illusion)
 "Nocturne -Rain Song-"
 "Muma -The Nightmare-" (夢魔 -The Nightmare-; Succubus -The Nightmare)
 "Romance"
 "Diabolo"

References 

Buck-Tick albums
2005 greatest hits albums